The Raung, or Mount Raung is one of the most active volcanoes on the island of Java in Indonesia. The difference in color of the rim and the flanks of the volcanoes is caused by the rim’s lack of vegetation compared with the healthy and extensive vegetation on the flanks. Raung, standing almost 3,332 metres (10,932 ft) above sea level, is the tallest volcano of this cluster. 

Although the valleys between the major volcanoes boast fertile, ash-enriched soil for agriculture, available land is very limited. Raung contains centres constructed along a NE to SW line, with Gunung Suket and Gunung Gadung stratovolcanoes being located to the northeast and west, respectively.
Mount Raung can be seen from Lovina Beach, Singaraja, North Bali. The normal route climbing is through Bondowoso and Sumber Wringin.

Its earliest recorded eruption was in 1586 which resulted in fatalities; between 1586 and 1817 five more deadly eruptions were recorded.

2015 Eruption 

The volcano started to display increased activity on 24 June 2015, and on 29 June 2015 began to eject material causing a dust cloud that resulted in warnings being issued to residents within  radius of the caldera, and causing disruption to flights in and out of nearby Bali.
According to Landsat images in early July 2015, there is a new lava pool on the mountain, giving the volcano two lava pools, including an older pool. This will likely delay the full eruption of the volcano for a short while. Currently the caldera is still sufficient to keep the lava inside.

From July 9, 2015, several airports throughout Indonesia—including on the popular holiday island of Bali and in Surabaya during Idul Fitri—were closed due to the ash being produced by the eruptions. The explosive ash emissions stopped during the afternoon of 14 August. It appears likely that the eruption has more or less come to an end.

Gallery

See also 
 List of volcanoes in Indonesia
 List of Ultras of Malay Archipelago

References

External links

Stratovolcanoes of Indonesia
Volcanoes of East Java
Calderas of Indonesia
Active volcanoes of Indonesia